Unconsecrated is the debut studio album by Australian deathcore band The Red Shore, released on 8 November 2008. It was originally set for a 22 September release through Siege of Amida Records, but was delayed. A limited edition was released as a CD/DVD package containing a documentary and live performance.

Background information
In an interview with Australian underground magazine Death Before Dishonour, Jamie Hope revealed that at the time of lead singer Damien Morris' death the band was working on their debut album, as a result the album will feature three tracks with Damien on vocals and the rest with Jamie Hope. He also revealed that the album will feature a slew of guest vocals from Brandan Schieppati of Bleeding Through, Hernan Hermida of All Shall Perish, Karl Schubach of Misery Signals and Dan Weyandt of Zao.

In the same interview, Hope also revealed Damien Morris' concept for the album: "...an epic tale of the forces of heaven and hell battling for the supremacy on the battleground of planet earth".

During I Killed The Prom Queen's 2008 "Say Goodbye" tour, a track titled "The Forefront of Failure" was circulated through promotional CDs distributed by Stomp.

Track listing

Bonus DVD

Documentary

 The Beginning
 Starting Out
 Enter Roman
 Exit Richie – Enter Jake
 Goodtimes
 The Crash
 The Funerals
 The Aftermath
 Say Goodbye Tour
 The Future

Live set

 "Intro/The Garden of Impurity"
 "Misery Hymn"
 "Flesh Couture"
 "The Valentines Day Massacre"
 "Deception: Prologue"
 "Slain by the Serpent"
 "Thy Devourer"
 "The Forefront of Failure/Outro"

Personnel
The Red Shore
Damien Morris – vocals (tracks 1, 5, 8)
Jamie Hope – vocals (tracks 2, 3, 4, 6, 7, 10)
Roman Koester – guitar
Jason Leombruni – guitar
Jon Green – bass
Jake Green – drums

Guest Musicians
Dan Weydant – vocals
Karl Shubach – vocals
Hernan Hermida – vocals
Brandan Scheppati – vocals
Recorded, produced and engineered by Roman Koester at Complex Studios, Melbourne
Mixed by Zack Ohren at Castle Ultimate Studios, Oakland, California
Art direction by Invisible Creature

Charts

References

The Red Shore albums
2008 albums
Rise Records albums